Agelasta glabrofasciata is a species of beetle in the family Cerambycidae. It was described by Pic in 1917. It is known from China.

References

glabrofasciata
Beetles described in 1917